Hebron is a town in Oxford County, Maine, United States. Hebron is included in the Lewiston-Auburn, Maine metropolitan New England city and town area. The town's history has always been interconnected with Hebron Academy, a co-ed college preparatory boarding school which is located in the town's heart. The population was 1,223 at the 2020 census. There is an elementary school, Hebron Station School, located on Station Road.

History
It was granted on March 8, 1777 by the Massachusetts General Court to Alexander Shepard, Jr. of Newton, Massachusetts as payment for a survey chart of the Maine coast that he had assisted making. It was named Shepardsfield Plantation, although early inhabitants called it Bog Brook Plantation. There was a farm settled in 1764 on what is now Sodom Road in Hebron before the Revolution and the grant to Alexander Shepard Jr. The first settlers of Shepardsfield Plantation were Captain Daniel Buckman and his family in 1778. Others followed, many fresh from the battlefields of the Revolutionary War. On February 27, 1829, Hebron's southwestern half was set off and incorporated as the town of Oxford.

Agriculture was the principal occupation, with hay the chief crop. In addition, the town had fine orchards. The outlet of Marshall Pond, the largest body of water, provided power for mills. There was a sawmill, shingle mill, pail factory, blacksmith shop and shoe shop. In 1804, Deacon William Barrows, Jr. was instrumental in founding Hebron Academy. The town would be crossed by the Rumford Falls and Buckfield Railroad. The Western Maine Sanatorium opened at Hebron in 1904, the first of its kind in the state. It treated tuberculosis patients with rest, fresh air and a healthy diet. Taken over by the state in 1915, it closed in 1959.

Geography
Hebron is drained by Cobb Brook, Cushman Brook, Bicknell Brook and Allen Brook.

The town is crossed by Maine State Route 119. It borders the towns of Buckfield to the north, Oxford to the south, Paris to the west, and Turner and Minot to the east.

Hebron Maine is known for the Rubellite Tourmaline found on Mt. Rubellite in Hebron Center.

Demographics

2010 census
As of the census of 2010, there were 1,416 people, 449 households, and 343 families living in the town. The racial makeup of the town was 93.9% White, 1.1% African American, 0.3% Native American, 3.5% Asian, and 1.3% from two or more races. Hispanic or Latino of any race were 1.6% of the population.

There were 449 households, of which 38.1% had children under the age of 18 living with them, 59.5% were married couples living together, 9.6% had a female householder with no husband present, 7.3% had a male householder with no wife present, and 23.6% were non-families. 15.6% of all households were made up of individuals, and 3.5% had someone living alone who was 65 years of age or older. The average household size was 2.76 and the average family size was 3.05.

The median age in the town was 33.4 years. 29.8% of residents were under the age of 18; 10.8% were between the ages of 18 and 24; 24.2% were from 25 to 44; 28.4% were from 45 to 64; and 7.1% were 65 years of age or older. The gender makeup of the town was 52.6% male and 47.4% female.

2000 census
As of the census of 2000, there were 1,053 people, 389 households, and 296 families living in the town. There were 410 housing units at an average density of 18.3 per square mile (7.1/km2). The racial makeup of the town was 97.82% White, 0.09% African American, 0.19% Native American, 0.57% Asian, 0.19% from other races, and 1.14% from two or more races. Hispanic or Latino of any race were 0.76% of the population.

There were 389 households, out of which 41.4% had children under the age of 18 living with them, 63.0% were married couples living together, 6.7% had a female householder with no husband present, and 23.7% were non-families. 18.8% of all households were made up of individuals, and 5.7% had someone living alone who was 65 years of age or older.  The average household size was 2.71 and the average family size was 3.07.

In the town, the population was spread out, with 27.4% under the age of 18, 7.5% from 18 to 24, 31.7% from 25 to 44, 26.5% from 45 to 64, and 6.9% who were 65 years of age or older.  The median age was 37 years. For every 100 females, there were 103.3 males.  For every 100 females age 18 and over, there were 101.3 males.

The median income for a household in the town was $45,417, and the median income for a family was $47,292. Males had a median income of $30,529 versus $22,900 for females. The per capita income for the town was $19,086.  About 3.0% of families and 4.6% of the population were below the poverty line, including 7.1% of those under age 18 and 2.9% of those age 65 or over.

Notable people 

 Horace A. Barrows, 19th century physician
 Albion K. Parris, US senator, fifth governor of Maine

References

External links
 Maine.gov – Hebron, Maine
 Town of Hebron official website
 Hebron Academy
 Maine Genealogy: Hebron, Oxford County, Maine

 
Towns in Oxford County, Maine
Towns in Maine